The 93rd New York Infantry Regiment (aka "Morgan Rifles") was an infantry regiment in the Union Army during the American Civil War.

Service
The 93rd New York Infantry was organized at Albany, New York between October 1861 and January 1862, and mustered in for three years service under the command of Colonel John S. Crocker.

The regiment was attached to 3rd Brigade, 3rd Division, IV Corps, Army of the Potomac, to May 18, 1862. Provost Guard, Army of the Potomac, to April 1864. 2nd Brigade, 3rd Division, II Corps, Army of the Potomac, to June 1865.

The 93rd New York Infantry mustered out of service on June 27, 1865.

Timeline of Service

February 17, 1862 - Moved to New York City.

March 7, 1862 - Departed New York City and arrived in Washington, D.C. 

March 30, 1862 - Embarked at Alexandria, Virginia for the Virginia Peninsula. 

April 5 to May 4, 1862 - The Siege of Yorktown. 

April 29, 1862 - Sent on reconnaissance towards Lee's Mills, Virginia.

May 5, 1862 - The Battle of Williamsburg. 

May 20-23, 1862 - Companies A, F, H, and K were sent on operations about Bottom's Bridge.

May 19 to June 25, 1862 - Companies B, C, D, E, G, and I held duty at White House Landing. 

June 25 to July 1, 1862 - The Battle of Seven Days.

July 2, 1862 - Operations about White House Landing. 

September 6-22, 1862 - The Maryland Campaign.

September 14, 1862 - The Battle of South Mountain.

September 17, 1862 - The Battle of Antietam.

December 12-15, 1862 - The Battle of Fredericksburg.

January 20-14, 1863 - "The Mud March".

April 27 to May 6, 1863 - The Chancellorsville Campaign.

May 1-5, 1863 - The Battle of Chancellorsville.

June 11 to July 24, 1863 - The Gettysburg Campaign.

July 1-3, 1863 - The Battle of Gettysburg.

July to October 1863 - Guard duty along the Rappahannock River.

October 9-22, 1863 - The Bristoe Campaign.

November 7-8, 1863 - Advance to line of the Rappahannock.

November 26 to December 2, 1863 - The Mine Run Campaign.

May 3 to June 15, 1864 - Campaign from the Rapidan River to the James River.

May 5-7, 1864 - The Battle of the Wilderness.

May 12-21, 1864 - The Battle of Spotsylvania Court House.

June 1-12, 1864 - The Battle of Cold Harbor.

June 16, 1864 to April 2, 1865 - The Siege of Petersburg.

April 9, 1865 - The Battle of Appomattox Court House.

April 11-13, 1865 - March to Burkesville.

May 2-15, 1865 - March to Washington, D.C. 

May 23, 1865 - The Grand Review of the Armies.

Casualties
The regiment lost a total of 258 men during service; 6 officers and 120 enlisted men killed or mortally wounded, 2 officers and 130 enlisted men died of disease.

Commanders
 Colonel John S. Crocker - captured April 29, 1862; exchanged and resumed command of the regiment January 1, 1864
 Colonel Samuel McConihe
 Colonel Haviland Gifford

See also

 List of New York Civil War regiments
 New York in the Civil War

References
 Corser, Elwood Spencer. Record of the Life of Elwood Spencer Corser of John A. Rawlins Post No. 126: Written for the Records of the Post (Minneapolis, MN: W. F. Black & Co.), 1911.
 Dyer, Frederick H. A Compendium of the War of the Rebellion (Des Moines, IA:  Dyer Pub. Co.), 1908.
 King, David H., A. Judson Gibbs, Jay H. Northrup. History of the Ninety-Third Regiment, New York Volunteer Infantry, 1861-1865 (Milwaukee, WI: Swain & Tate Co., Printers), 1895.
 Robertson, Robert Stoddart. From the Wilderness to Spottsylvania [sic]: A Paper Read Before the Ohio Commandery of the Military Order of the Loyal Legion of the United States (Cincinnati, OH: H. C. Sherick), 1884.
 -----. Personal Recollections of the War: A Record of Service with the Ninety-third New York Vol. Infantry, and the First Brigade, First Division, Second Corps, Army of the Potomac (Milwaukee, WI: Swain & Tate Co.), 1895.
Attribution

External links
 Regimental guidons of the 93rd New York Infantry
 93rd New York Infantry monument at Gettysburg

Military units and formations established in 1861
1861 establishments in New York (state)
Military units and formations disestablished in 1865
Infantry 093